Orthe may refer to:

 Orthe (series), series of science fiction novels by British writer Mary Gentle
 Orthe (Thessaly), town of Perrhaebia in ancient Thessaly
 Canton of Orthe et Arrigans, an administrative division of the Landes department, southwestern France